Rosa Maria Di Giorgi (born 11 August 1955) is an Italian politician.

Political career 
Di Giorgi was born in Reggio Calabria in 1955. She was a member of The Daisy between 2002 and 2007.

She was elected to the Italian Senate in the 2013 general election for the Democratic Party.

She was elected vice president of the Senate on 22 February 2017, replacing Valeria Fedeli.

She was elected to the Chamber of Deputies in the 2018 general election. She won the constituency of Florence-Scandicci with 56,565 votes (43%).

References 

1955 births
Living people
Senators of Legislature XVIII of Italy
Deputies of Legislature XVIII of Italy
21st-century Italian politicians
21st-century Italian women politicians
Democracy is Freedom – The Daisy politicians
Democratic Party (Italy) politicians
People from Reggio Calabria
Vice presidents of the Senate (Italy)
Women members of the Chamber of Deputies (Italy)
Women members of the Senate of the Republic (Italy)